{
    "type": "FeatureCollection",
  "features": [
    {
      "type": "Feature",
      "properties": {
        "marker-color": "#00aa00",
        "marker-size": "medium",
        "marker-symbol": "b"
      },
      "geometry": {
        "type": "Point",
        "coordinates": [
          65.39405076257106,
          40.138222811902565
        ]
      }
    }
  ]
}

Burquttepa — object of cultural heritage in Uzbekistan. Archaeological monument. It is located in Karmana District of Navoiy Region. Object period: III—II, V-VIII centuries BC. The object address:" Yangi Ariq, " MFY Kyzyltom village. Right: it is State property. Department of cultural heritage of Navoi region on the basis of the right of operational management. By the decision of Ministers of the Republic of Uzbekistan on October 4, 2019 it was included in National list of real estate objects of material and cultural heritage of Uzbekistan and taken under state protection.

Burquttepa is considered one of the most ancient settlements in Karmana. It is located 1 km east of Karmana town, on the right side of Bukhara—Samarkand road, next to the 6th Secondary School in Karmana District.

Archaeological studies
Archaeological excavations were carried out in the Burquttepa area in 1999-2002 to determine the age of the town of Karmana. During the excavations, objects from Burquttepa dating back to the 5th—4th centuries BC were found. Within the findings, the hum (jug) of the 4th or 3rd century BC, 90 cm in height, 30 cm in diameter of the indigenous part, 75 cm in diameter of the belly, 60 cm in diameter of the mouth, is noteworthy. This hum is now kept in the State Museum of history and culture of Navoi Region.

As a result of archaeological excavations, it was assumed that Burquttepa was a large Citadel, and the ancient place of Karmana was here. Burquttepa consists of an arch and a county. From there, the entire hum and a pipe directed towards it were found. Thisa hum and a pipe were made in the late 1st century BC and early 1st century AD. Archaeologists believe that the pipe found in Burquttepa is considered the most ancient material found in Western Sogdiana.

The lowest cultural layer of Burquttepa is close to early periods, such as Varakhsha, Poykent, it is assumed that it belonged to the IV—III centuries. The next two layers are III—II Centuries BC and II Centuries BC, it dates from the second half of the 2nd century and the 1st century AD.

In another excavation work, objects from the first centuries AD were found from the highest horizon of Burquttepa. In particular, traces of low, right-angled defensive walls have been identified from Shahristan square. Ceramic vessel fractures of the X—XIII centuries were found along the upper layer. These items are said to be important for determining the age of the town of Karmana.

References

Bibliography 
 
 

Archaeological sites in Uzbekistan